These links go to individual lists of television stations by the markets in which they are located.

United States

Continental States, Alaska, and Hawaii

There are 210 Designated Market Areas (DMAs) listed by the 2022–2023 Nielsen rankings:

New York (#1)
Los Angeles (#2)
Chicago (#3)
Philadelphia (#4)
Dallas-Fort Worth (#5)
San Francisco-Oakland-San Jose (#6)
Atlanta (#7)
Houston (#8)
Washington, D.C. (Hagerstown) (#9)
Boston (Manchester) (#10)
Phoenix (Prescott) (#11)
Seattle-Tacoma (#12)
Tampa-St. Petersburg (Sarasota) (#13)
Minneapolis-St. Paul (#14)
Detroit (#15)
Denver (#16)
Orlando-Daytona Beach-Melbourne (#17)
Miami-Fort Lauderdale (#18)
Cleveland-Akron (Canton) (#19)
Sacramento-Stockton-Modesto (#20)
Portland, OR (#21)
Charlotte (#22)
Raleigh-Durham (Fayetteville) (#23)
St. Louis (#24)
Indianapolis (#25)
Pittsburgh (#26)
San Diego (#27)
Baltimore (#28)
Nashville (#29)
Salt Lake City (#30)
San Antonio (#31)
Hartford & New Haven (#32)
Columbus, OH (#33)
Kansas City (#34)
Greenville-Spartanburg-Asheville-Anderson (#35)
Cincinnati (#36)
Milwaukee (#37)
Austin (#38)
West Palm Beach-Fort Pierce (#39)
Las Vegas (#40)
Grand Rapids-Kalamazoo-Battle Creek (#41)
Harrisburg-Lancaster-Lebanon-York (#42)
Jacksonville (#43)
Oklahoma City (#44)
Birmingham (Anniston and Tuscaloosa) (#45)
Norfolk-Portsmouth-Newport News (#46)
Greensboro-High Point-Winston-Salem (#47)
Albuquerque-Santa Fe (#48)
Louisville (#49)
New Orleans (#50)
Memphis (#51)
Providence-New Bedford (#52)
Buffalo (#53)
Fort Myers-Naples (#54)
Fresno-Visalia (#55)
Richmond-Petersburg (#56)
Mobile-Pensacola (Fort Walton Beach) (#57)
Wilkes Barre-Scranton-Hazleton (#58)
Little Rock-Pine Bluff (#59)
Albany-Schenectady-Troy (#60)
Tulsa (#61)
Knoxville (#62)
Lexington (#63)
Tucson (Sierra Vista) (#64)
Dayton (#65)
Spokane (#66)
Honolulu (#67)
Des Moines-Ames  (#68)
Green Bay-Appleton (#69)
Wichita-Hutchinson Plus (#70)
Roanoke-Lynchburg (#71)
Omaha (#72)
Flint-Saginaw-Bay City (#73)
Springfield, MO (#74)
Charleston-Huntington (#75)
Columbia, SC (#76)
Rochester, NY (#77)
Portland-Auburn (#78)
Huntsville-Decatur (Florence) (#79)
Toledo (#80)
Madison (#81)
Colorado Springs-Pueblo (#82)
Waco-Temple-Bryan (#83)
Paducah-Cape Girardeau-Harrisburg (#84)
Harlingen-Weslaco-Brownsville-McAllen (#85)
Shreveport-Texarkana (#86)
Syracuse (#87)
Chattanooga (#88)
Charleston, SC (#89)
Champaign & Springfield-Decatur (#90)
Savannah (#91)
Cedar Rapids-Waterloo-Iowa City & Dubuque (#92)
El Paso (Las Cruces) (#93)
Baton Rouge (#94)
Fort Smith-Fayetteville-Springdale-Rogers (#95)
Burlington-Plattsburgh (#96)
Jackson, MS (#97)
South Bend-Elkhart (#98)
Myrtle Beach-Florence (#99)
Tri-Cities, TN-VA (#100)
Boise (#101)
Greenville-New Bern-Washington (#102)
Davenport-Rock Island-Moline (#103)
Reno (#104)
Lincoln & Hastings-Kearney (#105)
Evansville (#106)
Johnstown-Altoona-State College (#107)
Tallahassee-Thomasville (#108)
Sioux Falls (Mitchell) (#109)
Tyler-Longview (Lufkin & Nacogdoches) (#110)
Fort Wayne (#111)
Augusta-Aiken (#112)
Eugene (#113)
Fargo (#114)
Lansing (#115)
Springfield-Holyoke (#116)
Yakima-Pasco-Richland-Kennewick (#117)
Traverse City-Cadillac (#118)
Youngstown (#119)
Macon (#120)
Santa Barbara-Santa Maria-San Luis Obispo (#121)
Lafayette, LA (#122)
Peoria-Bloomington (#123)
Monterey-Salinas (#124)
Bakersfield (#125)
Montgomery-Selma (#126)
Columbus, GA (#127)
Wilmington, NC (#128)
La Crosse-Eau Claire (#129)
Corpus Christi (#130)
Amarillo (#131)
Chico-Redding (#132)
Columbus-Tupelo-West Point-Houston (#133)
Medford-Klamath Falls (#134)
Columbia-Jefferson City (#135)
Wausau-Rhinelander (#136)
Salisbury (#137)
Odessa-Midland (#138)
Rockford (#139)
Duluth-Superior (#140)
Minot-Bismarck-Dickinson (Williston) (#141)
Topeka (#142)
Monroe-El Dorado (#143)
Beaumont-Port Arthur (#144)
Lubbock (#145)
Palm Springs (#146)
Anchorage (#147)
Sioux City (#148)
Wichita Falls & Lawton (#149)
Rochester-Mason City-Austin (#150)
Erie (#151)
Joplin-Pittsburg (#152)
Panama City (#153)
Albany, GA (#154)
Bangor (#155)
Terre Haute (#156)
Biloxi-Gulfport (#157)
Idaho Falls-Pocatello (Jackson) (#158)
Sherman-Ada (#159)
Gainesville (#160)
Missoula (#161)
Binghamton (#162)
Wheeling-Steubenville (#163)
Bluefield-Beckley-Oak Hill (#164)
Abilene-Sweetwater (#165)
Yuma-El Centro (#166)
Billings (#167)
Hattiesburg-Laurel (#168)
Rapid City (#169)
Clarksburg-Weston (#170)
Utica (#171)
Dothan (#172)
Lake Charles (#173)
Quincy-Hannibal-Keokuk (#174)
Jackson, TN (#175)
Harrisonburg (#176)
Charlottesville (#177)
Elmira (Corning) (#178)
Bowling Green (#179)
Watertown (#180)
Alexandria, LA (#181)
Jonesboro (#182)
Marquette (#183)
Bend, OR (#184)
Butte-Bozeman (#185)
Laredo (#186)
Grand Junction-Montrose (#187)
Lafayette, IN (#188)
Twin Falls (#189)
Lima (#190)
Meridian (#191)
Great Falls (#192)
Eureka (#193)
Parkersburg (#194)
Cheyenne-Scottsbluff (#195)
Greenwood-Greenville (#196)
San Angelo (#197)
Casper-Riverton (#198)
Mankato (#199)
Ottumwa-Kirksville (#200)
St. Joseph (#201)
Fairbanks (#202)
Zanesville (#203)
Victoria (#204)
Helena (#205)
Presque Isle (#206)
Juneau (#207)
Alpena (#208)
North Platte (#209)
Glendive (#210)

U.S. territories, commonwealths and insular areas
 United States Virgin Islands
 Puerto Rico
 Guam / Northern Mariana Islands
 American Samoa
 Federated States of Micronesia/Palau/Midway Island/Marshall Islands

Canada

Markets are Designated Market Areas (DMAs), as listed at TV Radio World. Edmundston/Woodstock, NB is part of the Presque Isle, ME DMA.

Territories
 Whitehorse, YT
 Yellowknife, NT
 Iqaluit, NU

Mexico

Markets are listed from north to south.
 Tijuana, B.Cal. / San Diego, CA
 Ensenada, B.Cal.
 Rosarito, B.Cal
 Mexicali. B.Cal. / Yuma, AZ / El Centro, CA
 Agua Prieta, Son. / Nogales (AZ-Son.)
 Hermosillo, Son.
 Chihuahua, Chih.
 Ciudad Juárez, Chih. / El Paso, TX
 Piedras Negras, Coah. / Ciudad Acuña, Coah. / Del Rio, TX / Eagle Pass, TX
 Nuevo Laredo, Tamps. / Laredo, TX
 Matamoros, Tamps. / Brownsville, TX / Rio Grande Delta
 Monterrey, N.L.
 Oaxaca, Oax.
 Durango, Dgo.
 Mazatlán, Sin.
 Ciudad Victoria,Tamps
 Tampico, Tamps.
 Poza Rica, Ver.
 Guadalajara, Jal.
 Puerto Vallarta, Jal.
 Mexico City, DF.
 Veracruz, Ver.
 Mérida, Yuc.
 Cancun, Q.Roo.
 Acapulco, Gro.

Caribbean & Central America

Caribbean/West Indies
Markets are listed from north to south.
 Hamilton, Bermuda
 Nassau, Bahamas/Freeport, Bahamas
 List of television stations in Cuba
 Port-au-Prince, Haiti
 Santiago, Dominican Republic
 Santo Domingo, Dominican Republic
 La Romana, Dominican Republic
 San Francisco de Macorís, Dominican Republic
 Road Town, British Virgin Islands
 George Town, Cayman Islands
 Oranjestad, Aruba/Willemstad, Netherlands Antilles
 Port-of-Spain, Trinidad/Scarborough Tobago

Central America

 Belize City, Belize
 Guatemala City, Guatemala
 San Pedro Sula/Tegucigalpa, Honduras
 San Salvador, El Salvador
 Managua, Nicaragua
 San José, Costa Rica
 Panama City, Panama

Greenland

 Kalaallit Nunaata Radioa
 Sisimiut – Sisimiut TV 7 (NBC)
 American Forces stations
 XPH 8 Thule
 XPJ 8 Sondrestrom
 XPH 13 Thule
(All AFRTS stations are 0.100 kW)

See also 
 List of television stations in Canada by call sign
 List of Canadian television networks (table)
 List of Canadian television channels
 List of Canadian specialty channels
 Category A services
 Category B services
 Category C services
 List of foreign television channels available in Canada
 List of United States stations available in Canada
 Digital television in Canada
 Multichannel television in Canada
 List of Canadian stations available in the United States
 List of United States over-the-air television networks
 List of TV markets and major sports teams
 List of the Caribbean television channels
 Lists of television stations in North America
 List of radio stations in North America by media market

 U.S. broadcast television template
 Canadian broadcast television template
 Mexican broadcast television template
 Lists of local television stations in North America

Sources and external links

Individual television station information
 FCC.gov TV Query Page
 FCCinfo.com
 TV Broadcasters of Canada
 W9WI.com – television station transmitter information
 fybush.com
 RabbitEars.Info

DXing and distant reception information
 DX Info Centre
 Caribbean TV
 TVDXTips.com

International (Caribbean and Central American) station information
 CBC-TV8 – Caribbean Broadcasting Corporation (Barbados)
 SVG-TV (Saint Vincent and the Grenadines Broadcasting Company)

North America